Peter J. P. Graham (September 15, 1827 – January 18, 1877) was an Ontario farmer and political figure. He represented Frontenac in the Legislative Assembly of Ontario as a Conservative member from 1875 to 1877.

He was born in Argyllshire, Scotland in 1827. He served as reeve for Pittsbugh and Howe Islands in 1871 and warden for Frontenac. He was a captain for the field battery at Kingston.

External links 

The Canadian parliamentary companion and annual register, 1876, HJ Morgan

Graham, Peter JP
Graham, Peter JP
People from Argyll and Bute
People from Frontenac County
Graham, Peter JP
Graham, Peter JP